Schomburg may refer to:

People
Alex Schomburg (1905–1998), prolific American commercial and comic book artist and painter whose career lasted over 70 years
Arturo Alfonso Schomburg (1874–1938), Puerto Rican historian, writer and activist in the United States
Wolfgang Schomburg (born 1948), the first German Judge at the International Criminal Tribunal for the former Yugoslavia

Places
a tiny village around a former castle called Schomburg, close to Wangen im Allgäu in southern Germany

See also
Schomburg Center for Research in Black Culture, part of the New York Public Library
Schaumburg (disambiguation)
Schomberg (disambiguation)
Schönberg (disambiguation)
Shamberg (disambiguation)